This is a list of members of the Senate of Canada in the 36th Parliament of Canada.

The province of Quebec has 24 Senate divisions which are constitutionally mandated. In all other provinces, a Senate division is strictly an optional designation of the senator's own choosing, and has no real constitutional or legal standing. A senator who does not choose a special senate division is designated a senator for the province at large.

Names in bold indicate senators in the 26th Canadian Ministry.

List of senators

Senators at the beginning of the 36th Parliament

 Willie Adams represented the Northwest Territories until the creation of Nunavut in 1999 when he became the Senator for Nunavut.

Senators appointed during the 36th Parliament

Left Senate during the 36th Parliament

Changes in party affiliation during the 36th Parliament

See also
List of current Canadian senators

References

36
Canadian parliaments